The following is a list of films produced and/or released by Columbia Pictures in 2020–2029. Most films listed here were distributed theatrically in the United States and in other countries by the company's distribution division, Sony Pictures Releasing. It is one of the Big Five film studios. Columbia Pictures is a subsidiary of multinational conglomerate Sony.

All films listed are theatrical releases unless specified. Films with a ‡ signifies a streaming release exclusively through a streaming service.

Released

Upcoming

Undated films

See also
 
 Columbia Pictures
 List of TriStar Pictures films
 List of Screen Gems films
 List of Sony Pictures Classics films
 List of Sony theatrical animated feature films
 :Category:Lists of films by studio

Notes

References

2020
American films by studio
Sony Pictures Entertainment Motion Picture Group